The Fish Lake Wildlife Area(FLWA) is a  tract of protected land located in Burnett County, Wisconsin, managed by the Wisconsin Department of Natural Resources (WDNR). Lands to be included in the wildlife area were first purchased in 1945 with the goal of restoring the conditions of the general area to what was observed in 1850, right before the first human settlements reached the area. The FLWA is made up of three separate areas, the  Fish Lake Habitat Management Area, the  Fish Lake Pines State Natural Area and the Grettum Flowage Wildlife Refuge zone.

Fish Lake
The lake is noted for being exceptionally clear in both the east and west basin, with water clarity, perception, and color all receiving the best possible grades. Boat access to the lake is provided via a boat landing off of Pine Knoll Lane.

Land cover
The FLWA was included in the Glacial Lake Grantsburg property complex, which also includes the Amsterdam Sloughs Wildlife Area and the Crex Meadows Wildlife Area, and as such was subject to the long range goal of all three units being managed for waterfowl. 

Flora and Fauna
There are several different types of trees residing in the Wildlife Area, the most prominent being oak, maple, hemlock, and red pine. In addition to the varied flora, in both Swan Lake and the surrounding marshland, musky, Northern pike, largemouth bass, walleye and northern pike are commonly found. Besides sea dwelling fauna, black tern, turkey and shorebirds have been known to frequent the area.

See also
 Amsterdam Sloughs Wildlife Area
 Crex Meadows Wildlife Area

References

External links
 U.S. Geological Survey Map at the U.S. Geological Survey Map Website. Retrieved March 1, 2023.
 Surface Water Data Viewer Map at the WNDR Website. Retrieved April 22nd, 2022.
 Secchi Graph East at the WDNR Website. Retrieved 2022-04-22
 Secchi Graph West at the WDNR Website. Retrieved 2022-04-22

State Wildlife Areas of Wisconsin
Protected areas of Wisconsin
Geography of Burnett County, Wisconsin
Protected areas established in 1946